The 2002 Nokia Cup, southern Ontario men's provincial curling championship was held January 28-February 3 at the Quinte Sports Centre in Belleville, Ontario.  The winning John Morris from Stayner would represent Ontario at the 2002 Nokia Brier in Calgary, Alberta.

Top teams in the province such as Wayne Middaugh, Glenn Howard and Rich Moffatt did not attempt to qualify for the event, after having signed a deal with the Grand Slam of Curling promising not to enter non-World Curling Tour events.

Teams

Standings

Playoffs

Sources
Nokia Cup - Coverage on curlingzone.com
Ontario Curling Association: 2002 Nokia Cup - Internet Archive

Ontario
Ontario Tankard
Sport in Belleville, Ontario
2002 in Ontario